Vlado Bojović (born 10 June 1952) is a former handball player who competed for Yugoslavia in the 1976 Summer Olympics. 

He was born in Celje.

In 1976 he was part of the Yugoslav team which finished fifth in the Olympic tournament. He played four matches and scored two goals.

External links
 profile

1952 births
Living people
Yugoslav male handball players
Olympic handball players of Yugoslavia
Handball players at the 1976 Summer Olympics
Sportspeople from Celje
Slovenian male handball players
Slovenian people of Serbian descent